Friedrich Robertovitch Lips (born November, 18th 1948 in Yemanzhelinsk) is a Russian bayanist/accordionist of German origin. Since 1989 he has been professor of the bayan accordion department at the Gnesin Russian Academy of Music, one of two music academies in Moscow. He worked as a soloist, chamber musician, arranger, book author and teacher. In 1994 he was honored as a People's Artist of the Russian Federation.

Biography 
Friedrich Lips was born in 1948 to parents of German origin in the city of Yemanzhelinsk (Chelyabinsk district). In 1967 he finished his education at the "Mikhail Glinka" music school in Magnitogorsk in the class of E. Kudinov (bayan, conducting). He then went to Moscow to the Gnesin State Institute for Music Education, where he was a master student of Sergey Kolobkov and took his exams in his class in 1972 (bayan, conducting) and completed his postgraduate education in 1974. 

From 1971 onwards he himself worked as a teacher at the Gnesin Institute. In 1980 he was appointed lecturer and in 1989 professor. Since 1996 he has been head of the Folk Instruments Department - to which the bayan accordion is assigned - at the institute, which has since been renamed the Russian Academy of Music. As a visiting professor, he taught at institutions and academies in Irun, Spain; Groningen, Netherlands; Royal Academy of Music, London; Tianjin, Shanghai, China. As a guest lecturer, he is internationally active in seminars, master classes and educational courses and also acted as a juror in music competitions. In 1989 he founded the international music festival "Bayan and Bayanists" in Moscow, which he chairs as Artistic Director, and initiated the Moscow Music Prize "Silver Disc" for bayan/accordion soloists.

During his work as a teacher, many musicians emerged from his classes who have since become award winners of national and international competitions, concert musicians and educators. As a performing artist, Friedrich Lips was first prize winner at the international music competition in Klingenthal (GDR) in 1969. In 1970 he was signed to the state Soviet concert agency Goskoncert. This is how he started his career as a concert virtuoso and chamber musician. In the following 30 years of uninterrupted concert activity, concerts took him to the US, Canada, China, France, Spain, Italy, Switzerland, Austria, Germany, the Netherlands, Japan, Norway, Denmark, to concert halls (including the Great Hall of the Moscow Conservatory, Concertgebouw Amsterdam, Suntory Hall Tokyo, Lincoln Center New York, JF Kennedy Center Washington, to the musicians Gidon Kremer, Vladimir Igolinsky, Yo-Yo Ma, Vladimir Tonkha, Mark Pekarski and to the composers Sergey Berinsky, Mikhail Bronner, Alexander Kholminov , Evgeny Derbenko, Edison Denisov, Sofia Gubaidulina, Efrem Podgaits, Alfred Schnittke, Vladislav Zolotaryov, Kirill Volkov, Roman Ledenyov, Tatyana Sergeyeva, Vladimir Ryabov.

Significance 

He has worked in chamber music ensembles and has given concerts with orchestras under the direction of Gennady Rozhdestvensky, Vladimir Spivakov, Yuri Bashmet, Oleg Agarkov, Timur Mynbayev, Yuri Nikolayevsky,Yūji Takahashi, Luca Pfaff, Lev Markis, Dmitry Liss, and Valery Gergiev. Many works were dedicated to him personally, more than 50 works were premiered by himself and 100 compositions - on more than 30 CDs - recorded and published in various countries in America, Europe and Asia. The CD Seven Words, released in Moscow, was awarded the "Diapason d’or" as CD of the year in Paris in 1991. In the US, the CD "Russian and Trepak" was awarded the 3rd prize in a competition organized by Just Plain Folks Music Awards 2006 in the category classical among solo albums with 25,500 nominated CDs.   

He is also the author of music theory writings, articles and specialist books of importance. e.g. The Art of Bayan Playing (Kamen, 1991), The Art of Bayan Playing (Kamen, 2000), The Art of Editing Classical Music for Accordion (Kamen, 2017), The Art of Arranging Classical music for Accordion (Kamen, 2018), It seems like yesterday ... (Moscow, 2018).

Awards 
 1993 Silver disc of the festival "Bayan and bayanists"

 1994 State award "People's Artist of Russia"

 2001 Musical Review: "Person of the Year"

 2001 Order of Friendship
 2005 Children's Art School No. 1 in Yemanzhelinsk was named after its first graduate Friedrich Lips

 2006 honorary citizen of the Yemanzhelinsk district of the Chelyabinsk region

 2008 "Bright Past" award from the O. Mityaev Foundation and the government of the Chelyabinsk region

 2008 Gold medal of the Moscow Security Committee on the twentieth anniversary of the Moscow Autumn Festival

 2008 "Merit Award" of the Confédération Internationale des Accordéonistes

 2009 Russian Performing Arts Foundation: Golden Talent of Russia Diploma

 2010 Honorary Professor at the London Academy of Music (Great Britain)

 2011 Moscow City Prize

 2015 laureate of the International Music Education Prize Ippolitova-Ivanova named after him

 2019 As part of the "2019 World Music Awards", Friedrich Lips was voted "Musician of the Year" by the Accordion Stars Illustrated Magazine in New York, he received a "Lifetime Achievement Award" and was inducted into the "Accordion World Hall of Fame".

World premieres

References

External links 

Academic staff of Gnessin State Musical College
Classical accordionists
20th-century accordionists
21st-century Russian musicians
People's Artists of Russia
1948 births
Living people
21st-century accordionists
Russian people of German descent
People from Chelyabinsk Oblast
Gnessin State Musical College alumni
20th-century Russian musicians
Russian accordionists